McFadden's Flats is a 1935 American comedy film directed by Ralph Murphy and written by Arthur Caesar, Edward Kaufman, Andy Rice and Casey Robinson. The film stars Walter C. Kelly, Andy Clyde, Richard Cromwell, Jane Darwell, Betty Furness, George Barbier and Phyllis Brooks. The film was released on March 29, 1935, by Paramount Pictures.

Plot

Cast 
Walter C. Kelly as Dan McFadden
Andy Clyde as Jock McTavish
Richard Cromwell as Sandy MacTavish
Jane Darwell as Nora McFadden
Betty Furness as Molly McFadden
George Barbier as Mr. Hall
Phyllis Brooks as Mary Ellis Hall
Howard Wilson as Robert Hall
Nella Walker as Mrs. Hall
Frederick Burton as Jefferson

References

External links 
 

1935 films
American comedy films
1935 comedy films
Paramount Pictures films
Films directed by Ralph Murphy
American black-and-white films
1930s English-language films
1930s American films